Santo Domingo de la Calzada is a municipality in La Rioja, Spain, situated on the banks of the Oja River.  Its name refers to its founder, Dominic de la Calzada, who built a bridge, hospital, and hotel here for pilgrims on the French Way the most popular path of the Way of St. James.  He began construction of the town's Cathedral of Santo Domingo de la Calzada is buried within and it is dedicated to him.

Philosopher Gustavo Bueno Martínez was born here in 1924.

Santo Domingo de la Calzada is also the site of the miracle of the "hanged innocent" a pilgrim wrongly accused of theft. The witnesses for his successful appeal,  a pair of beheaded, supposedly cooked chickens are represented by their descendants, a pair of whom are kept at all times in the choir loft of the cathedral. Other descendants are kept in the local pilgrimage refuge.

Politics

Notable people 
 Henry II of Castile died in the city in 1379
 Gustavo Bueno
 Jerónimo Hermosilla
 Ángel Augusto de Monasterio

See also
Dominic de la Calzada

References

External links

 Historia, cultura, gastronomía y actividades de Santo Domingo de la Calzada

Municipalities in La Rioja (Spain)